The 8th Air Division (8th AD) is an inactive United States Air Force organization.  Its last assignment was with Air Defense Command, being stationed at McClellan Air Force Base, California.  It was inactivated on 1 July 1957.

History
The 8th AD was established in 1949. Its initial assignment was the air defense of North and South Carolina under Fourteenth Air Force.  It was inactivated in 1950 with its air defense mission taken over by Eastern Air Defense Force.

In 1954 it was re-activated under Western Air Defense Force with a mission of being the command and control organization for Airborne early warning and control (AEW&C) units of Air Defense Command.  Its mission also included the training and equipping of Lockheed EC-121 Warning Star AEW&C units.

Division components flew early warning missions in "flying radar stations" off the Atlantic and Pacific coasts of the United States until its inactivation in July 1957, its mission being taken over directly by the Western Air Defense Force.

Lineage
 Established as the 8th Air Division (Tactical) on 7 April 1949
 Activated on 1 May 1949.
 Inactivated on 1 August 1950
 Redesignated 8th Air Division (Airborne Early Warning and Control) on 19 April 1954
 Activated on 1 May 1954
 Inactivated on 1 July 1957

Assignments
 Fourteenth Air Force, 1 May 1949 – 1 August 1950
 Western Air Defense Force, 1 May 1954
 Air Defense Command, 1 May 1955 - 1 July 1957

Stations
 Pope Air Force Base, North Carolina, 1 May 1949 – 1 August 1950
 McClellan Air Force Base, California, 1 May 1954 - 1 July 1957

Components
Wings
 551st Airborne Early Warning and Control Wing: 18 December 1954 – 1 July 1957
 Otis Air Force Base, Massachusetts
 552d Airborne Early Warning and Control Wing: 8 July 1955 – 1 July 1957.
 McClellan Air Force Base, California

Squadrons
 963d Airborne Early Warning and Control Squadron: 8 March - 8 July 1955
 McClellan Air Force Base, California
 964th Airborne Early Warning and Control Squadron: 8 March - 8 July 1955
 McClellan Air Force Base, California
 4701st Airborne Early Warning and Control Squadron: 1 May 1954 – 8 March 1955
 McClellan Air Force Base, California
 4712th Airborne Early Warning and Control: 25 May 1954 – 8 March 1955.
 McClellan Air Force Base, California

See also
 List of USAF Aerospace Defense Command General Surveillance Radar Stations
 Aerospace Defense Command Fighter Squadrons
 List of United States Air Force air divisions

References

Notes

Bibliography

External links
 Air Force Historical Research Agency: 8th Air Division

Military units and formations in California
008
Military units and formations established in 1949
Military units and formations disestablished in 1957